Martín Gerardo Morel (born 5 November 1980 in Rosario) is a retired Argentine football midfielder.

Career 

Morel was a late developer, not playing professionally until the age of 25. Morel was discovered playing for Sportivo Las Parejas and joined Tigre in 2006.

In his first season with Tigre Morel helped the club to gain promotion to the Argentine Primera. The Apertura 2007 was Tigre's first season in the Primera since 1980, and Morel's first taste of top flight football. Morel was not a regular in the first team, but chipped in with three goals in his seven appearances. The club finished in 2nd place which was the highest league finish in their history. During the Apertura 2008 Morel was an important part of the Tigre squad that again reached the runner-up position. He scored a total of 13 goals throughout the tournament.

In the summer 2010 Martin Morel signed for Colombian team Deportivo Cali. He will play the 2010/11 season in Liga Postobón.

He announced his arrival at Deportivo Cali with a superb hat-trick in their 5-3 victory over Once Caldas.

External links
 Football-Lineups player profile
  
 Argentine Primera statistics at Fútbol XXI 

1980 births
Living people
Argentine footballers
Argentine expatriate footballers
Footballers from Rosario, Santa Fe
Association football midfielders
Club Atlético Tigre footballers
Deportivo Cali footballers
Club Universitario de Deportes footballers
All Boys footballers
Atlético Tucumán footballers
Cúcuta Deportivo footballers
Sportivo Las Parejas footballers
Club Atlético Fénix players
Argentine Primera División players
Categoría Primera A players
Categoría Primera B players
Argentine expatriate sportspeople in Colombia
Argentine expatriate sportspeople in Peru
Expatriate footballers in Colombia
Expatriate footballers in Peru